Christiane Bettina Klopsch (born 21 August 1990 in Marburg) is a German athlete specialising in the 400 metres hurdles. Her biggest individual achievement is the fourth place at the 2015 Summer Universiade in Gwangju.

Her personal best in the event is 56.02 seconds set in Regensburg in 2014.

Competition record

Personal bests
Outdoor
400 metres – 52.99 (Oordegem-Lede 2014)
400 metres hurdles – 56.02 (Regensburg 2014)
Indoor
400 metres – 53.69 (Karlsruhe 2015)

References

External links 
 

1990 births
Living people
Sportspeople from Marburg
German female hurdlers
Competitors at the 2011 Summer Universiade
Competitors at the 2013 Summer Universiade
Competitors at the 2015 Summer Universiade
20th-century German women
21st-century German women